There are numerous crossings of the Housatonic River, both by road and railroad bridge.  The following is a list of crossings of the Housatonic River in order of occurrence from the river mouth at Long Island Sound to its principal source streams in the Berkshire Mountains.

Connecticut

Massachusetts

Rt.7:  42° 04' 29"N, 73° 20' 00"W
Maple Avenue (Ashley Falls):  42° 06' 32"N, 73° 20' 24"W
7-23 (Great Barrington):  42° 12' 05"N, 73° 21' 28"W
Rt.183:  42° 15' 15"N, 73° 21' 55"W
Housatonic Railroad:  42° 16' 31"N, 73° 21' 35"W
Rt.7 (Stockbridge):  42° 16' 44"N, 73° 18' 50"W
Housatonic Railroad:  42° 16' 31"N, 73° 16' 08"W
Rt.102:  42° 17' 34"N, 73° 14' 27"W
I-90:  42° 17' 52"N, 73° 14' 27"W
Housatonic Railroad:  42° 18' 20"N, 73° 15' 08"W
Rt.20:  42° 18' 37"N, 73° 15' 16"W
Mill Street (East Lee):  42° 19' 57"N, 73° 14' 47"W
Housatonic Railroad:  42° 19' 59"N, 73° 14' 44"W
Holmes Rd (Pittsfield):  42° 25' 48"N, 73° 14' 19"W

East branch
The following crossings refer to where the West branch of the Housatonic River splits, and the East branch begins:

Appleton Ave (Pittsfield):  42° 26' 25"N, 73° 14' 54"W
Elm St (Pittsfield):  42° 26' 42"N, 73° 14' 38"W
East St (Pittsfield):  42° 27' 10"N, 73° 12' 21"W
CSX Berkshire Subdivision:  42° 27' 22"N, 73° 12' 14"W
South St (Pittsfield):  42° 28' 06"N, 73° 10' 54"W
Rt.8 (Pittsfield):  42° 28' 27"N, 73° 09' 24"W
Rt.8:  42° 28' 04"N, 73° 08' 32"W
Rt.8:  42° 27' 26"N, 73° 07' 48"W
Rt.8:  42° 26' 37"N, 73° 07' 45"W
Rt.8:  42° 25' 34"N, 73° 06' 44"W
Source at Muddy Pond:  42° 23' 11"N, 73° 06' 42"W

West branch
The following crossings are along the west branch of the Housatonic River:

7-20:  42° 26' 11"N, 73° 15' 26"W
Southwest Branch splits
Rt.20:  42° 26' 38"N, 73° 15' 39"W
CSX Berkshire Subdivision:  42° 26' 49"N, 73° 15' 50"W
West St (Pittsfield):  42° 26' 59"N, 73° 15' 48"W
Pontoosuc Ave (Pittsfield):  42° 27' 59"N, 73° 15' 06"W
Hancock Rd:  42° 29' 02"N, 73° 14' 47"W
Source at Pontoosuc Lake:  42° 29' 43"N, 73° 14' 51"W

Southwest branch
The following list contains Housatonic River crossings along its southwest branch:

Housatonic Railroad:  42° 26' 22"N, 73° 16' 02"W
Rt.20:  42° 26' 23"N, 73° 17' 38"W
Rt.20:  42° 26' 18"N, 73° 18' 08"W
Source at Richmond Pond:  42° 24' 51"N, 73° 19' 28"W

Rivers of Connecticut
Bridges in Connecticut
Rivers of Massachusetts
Transportation in Fairfield County, Connecticut
Transportation in New Haven County, Connecticut
Transportation in Litchfield County, Connecticut
Connecticut transportation-related lists
Lists of river crossings in the United States